|}

The Stewards' Cup is a flat handicap horse race in Great Britain open to horses aged three years or older. It is run at Goodwood over a distance of 6 furlongs (1,207 metres), and it is scheduled to take place each year in late July or early August.

History
For several years in the 1830s the senior steward at Goodwood presented an annual cup to the winner of any race of his choosing. The choice varied each year, and the trophy was awarded for events with distances of up to 1½ miles. A perpetual race for the Stewards' Cup over a sprint distance of 6 furlongs was conceived by Lord George Bentinck in late 1839, and the inaugural running took place the following summer.

The first commercial sponsor of the Stewards' Cup was Spillers, a company associated with the race from 1970 to 1980. The event was backed by the Tote in 1981, and by William Hill from 1982 to 1992.

The race was formerly held on the opening day of the five-day Glorious Goodwood meeting. It was moved to the final day in 1993, and from this point it was sponsored by Vodafone. The sponsorship was taken over by Blue Square in 2007, and in 2013 the race was sponsored by Robins Farm Racing. In 2014 Goodwood announced that 32Red would take over the sponsorship and the race would lose its historic title, being run as the 32Red Cup. The 2015 running was sponsored by Qatar and the name reverted to the Stewards' Cup.

Records

Most successful horse (2 wins):
 Marvel – 1890, 1892
 Golden Rod – 1910, 1912
 Lord Annandale – 1913, 1914 (dead-heat)
 Sugar Palm – 1942, 1943
 Sky Diver – 1967, 1968
 Commanche Falls -  2021, 2022 

Leading jockey (4 wins):
 Richard Hughes – Shikari's Son (1995), Harmonic Way (1999), Tayseer (2000), Intrinsic (2014)

Leading trainer (4 wins):
 John Scott – Epirus (1840), Psalmsinger (1845), Longbow (1853), Sweetsauce (1860)
 James Jewitt – Sweetbread (1884), Crafton (1886), Amphora (1897), Altesse (1898)

Winners since 1978
 Weights given in stones and pounds.

Earlier winners

 1840: Epirus
 1841: Garry Owen
 1842: Lady Adela
 1843: Yorkshire Lady
 1844: Sir Abstrupus
 1845: Psalmsinger
 1846: Lady Wildair
 1847: The Cur
 1848: The Admiral
 1849: Cotton Lord
 1850: Turnus
 1851: Loadstone
 1852: Kilmeny
 1853: Longbow
 1854: Pumicestone
 1855: Clotilde
 1856: New Brighton
 1857: Tournament
 1858: Glenmasson
 1859: Maid of Kent
 1860: Sweetsauce
 1861: Croagh Patrick
 1862: Lady Clifden
 1863: Birdhill
 1864: Marigold
 1865: Out and Outer
 1866: Sultan
 1867: Tibthorpe
 1868: Vex
 1869: Fichu
 1870: Typhoeus
 1871: Anton
 1872: Oxonian
 1873: Sister Helen
 1874: Modena
 1875: Trappist
 1876: Monaco
 1877: Herald
 1878: Midlothian
 1879: Peter
 1880: Elf King
 1881: Mazurka
 1882: Lowland Chief
 1883: Hornpipe
 1884: Sweetbread
 1885: Dalmeny
 1886: Crafton
 1887: Upset
 1888: Tib
 1889: Dog Rose
 1890: Marvel
 1891: Unicorn
 1892: Marvel
 1893: Medora
 1894: Gangway
 1895: Wise Virgin
 1896: Chasseur
 1897: Amphora
 1898: Altesse
 1899: Northern Farmer
 1900: Royal Flush
 1901: O'Donovan Rossa
 1902: Mauvezin
 1903: Dumbarton Castle
 1904: Melayr
 1905: Xeny
 1906: Rocketter
 1907: Romney
 1908: Elmstead
 1909: Mediant
 1910: Golden Rod
 1911: Braxted
 1912: Golden Rod
 1913: Lord Annandale
 1914: Golden Sun / Lord Annandale *
 1915: Clap Gate
 1916: All Serene
 1917: Trojan
 1918: no race
 1919: King Sol
 1920: Western Wave
 1921: Service Kit
 1922: Tetrameter
 1923: Epinard
 1924: Compiler
 1925: Defiance
 1926: Perhaps So
 1927: Priory Park
 1928: Navigator
 1929: Fleeting Memory
 1930: Le Phare
 1931: Poor Lad
 1932: Solenoid
 1933: Pharacre
 1934: Figaro
 1935: Greenore
 1936: Solerina
 1937: Firozepore
 1938: Harmachis
 1939: Knight's Caprice
 1940: no race
 1941: Valthema
 1942: Sugar Palm
 1943: Sugar Palm
 1944: British Colombo
 1945: Happy Grace
 1946: Commissar
 1947: Closeburn
 1948: Dramatic
 1949: The Bite
 1950: First Consul
 1951: Sugar Bowl
 1952: Smokey Eyes
 1953: Palpitate
 1954: Ashurst Wonder
 1955: King Bruce
 1956: Matador
 1957: Arcandy
 1958: Epaulette
 1959: Tudor Monarch
 1960: Monet
 1961: Skymaster
 1962: Victorina
 1963: Creole
 1964: Dunme
 1965: Potier
 1966: Patient Constable
 1967: Sky Diver
 1968: Sky Diver
 1969: Royal Smoke
 1970: Jukebox
 1971: Apollo Nine
 1972: Touch Paper
 1973: Alphadamus
 1974: Red Alert
 1975: Import
 1976: Jimmy the Singer
 1977: Calibina

See also
 Horse racing in Great Britain
 List of British flat horse races

References

 Racing Post:
 galopp-sieger.de – Stewards' Cup.
 pedigreequery.com – Stewards' Cup – Goodwood.
 

Flat races in Great Britain
Goodwood Racecourse
Open sprint category horse races
Recurring sporting events established in 1840
1840 establishments in England